Ewing Island is an uninhabited island, part of the Auckland Islands group, a subantarctic chain that forms part of the New Zealand outlying islands.  It lies in the north-east of the group, close to the mouth of Port Ross, immediately to the south of the larger Enderby Island and off the north-eastern tip of the main Auckland Island.

Important Bird Area
The island is part of the Auckland Island group Important Bird Area (IBA), identified as such by BirdLife International because of the significance of the group as a breeding site for several species of seabirds as well as the endemic Auckland shag, Auckland teal, Auckland rail and Auckland snipe. Both red-crowned parakeets and yellow-crowned parakeets live on Ewing Island, making this the second southernmost location of living parrots.

See also 

 Scientific Committee on Antarctic Research
 New Zealand subantarctic islands
 List of Antarctic and subantarctic islands
 List of islands of New Zealand
 List of islands
 Desert island

References

Islands of the Auckland Islands
Important Bird Areas of the Auckland Islands
Uninhabited islands of New Zealand